Events in the year 1837 in Belgium.

Incumbents
Monarch: Leopold I
Prime Minister: Barthélémy de Theux de Meylandt

Events
 21 March – Flooding in Burcht and Stabroek.
 13 June – Parliamentary elections
 19 June – Charles van Hulthem's book collection bought by the state; the core of the collection of the Royal Library of Belgium.
 21 August – Victor Hugo travels by train for the first time while visiting Belgium.
 4 October – Société Civile pour l'Agrandissement et l'Embellissement de Bruxelles established, to develop the Leopold Quarter in Brussels.
 12 November – Parliament approves 10 million franc government loan to build railways.
 28 December – Pastoral letter of Belgian bishops deprecates Catholic membership of masonic lodges.

Publications
Periodicals
 Almanach de poche de Bruxelles (Brussels, M.-E. Rampelbergh)
Annuaire du clergé catholique du royaume de Belgique (Brussels, Veuve J.-J. Vanderborght)
 Journal historique et littéraire, vol. 4 (Liège, P. Kersten).
 Messager des sciences et des arts de la Belgique, vol. 5 (Ghent, Léonard Hebbelynck)
 Revue de Bruxelles begins publication

Reference works
 Pasinomie, ou Collection complète des lois, décrets, arrêtés et règlements généraux qui peuvent être invoqués en Belgique
 Dictionnaire des hommes de lettres, des savans et des artistes de la Belgique (Brussels, Établissement Géographique)

Non-fiction
 Joseph Jean De Smet (ed.), Recueil des chroniques de Flandre, vol. 1.
 Johann Wilhelm Löbell, Lettres sur la Belgique (Brussels)
 Félix Victor Goethals, Lectures relatives à l'histoire des sciences, des arts, des lettres, des moeurs, et de la politique en Belgique, et dans les pays limitrophes, vol. 1 (Brussels, Imprimerie de Vandooren for the author).

Fiction
 Jules de Saint-Genois, La cour du duc Jean IV, chronique brabançonne, 1418-1421

Births
26 February – Charles Woeste, politician (died 1922)
24 March – Prince Philippe, Count of Flanders (died 1905)
14 June – Frans Jozef Peter van den Branden, writer (died 1922)
5 December – Camille Janssen, colonial governor (died 1926)
27 December – Émile de Borchgrave, diplomat (died 1917)

Deaths
27 February – Françoise-Jeanne Ridderbosch (born 1754), artist
17 April – Édouard de Walckiers (born 1758), banker
8 May – James Cockerill (born 1787), industrialist
17 August – Charles Felix Van Quickenborne (born 1788), founder of Saint Louis University.

References

 
1830s in Belgium